Skin Folk is a story collection by Jamaican-Canadian writer Nalo Hopkinson, published in 2001. Winner of the 2002 World Fantasy Award for Best Story Collection, it was also selected in 2002 for the New York Times Summer Reading List and was one of the New York Times Best Books of the Year.

Reviews
 David Soyka (2002), "Skin Folk" (review). SF Site.

References

2001 short story collections
Works by Nalo Hopkinson
Science fiction short story collections
World Fantasy Award-winning works
Canadian short story collections